Janine Nabers is an American playwright and television writer.

Early life 
Nabers was born in Houston, Texas to Janet and Cornelius Nabers. She attended Alief Elsik High School in Houston. Nabers has a BA in theater from Ithaca College and an MFA in playwriting from The New School. She is also a graduate of the Lila Acheson Wallace American Playwrights Program at the Juilliard School in New York City.

Career

Theater 
Nabers was initially interested in becoming a stage actress but her frustration with the lack of black roles in plays encouraged her to try playwriting instead. In her time at Juilliard, her play Annie Bosh is Missing was chosen as a finalist for the 2012-2013 Alliance/Kendeda National Graduate Playwriting Competition. Annie Bosh is Missing follows 22-year-old drug addict Annie Bosh who wanders the tumultuous streets of Houston after Hurricane Katrina. The play had its premiere at the Steppenwolf Theatre Company in 2013.

Nabers' play, Serial Black Face, about a single mother coping with the disappearance of her son during the Atlanta child murders, won the 2014 Yale Drama Series prize. The award included publication by the Yale University Press. Serial Black Face had its world premiere at the Actor's Express Theatre Company in Atlanta, Georgia in 2016.

Nabers' other works include A Swell in the Ground, which premiered at the Gift Theatre in Chicago, Illinois in 2017 and Welcome to Jesus, which premiered at The American Theater Company in Chicago in 2017, Juniper; Jubilee and The Peterson Show.

Television 
Nabers' television writing credits include Bravo's first scripted series Girlfriends' Guide to Divorce, Lifetime's UnREAL and AMC's Dietland. She is credited as Supervising Producer on the first and second episodes of HBO's Watchmen and Co-Executive Producer on Netflix's Away. More recently, she signed a deal with Amazon Studios.

Honors and awards 
In 2011, Nabers was the recipient of the Page 73 Playwriting Fellowship. In 2012, she was named a New York Theatre Workshop Playwriting Fellow. Nabers won the 2013 New York Foundation for the Arts Playwriting fellowship and was the 2013-2014 AETNA Playwriting Fellow at Hartford Stage. She is an alumna of the Ars Nova Play Group, the Soho Rep Writer/Director Lab, the Dramatists Guild Playwriting Fellowship, the MacDowell Colony Fellowship, and the 2010 and 2011 Sundance Theatre Labs. She is also a member of the MCC Playwrights Coalition and the Dorothy Strelsin New American Writers Group at Primary Stages. As a 2015-2016 participant in the LA Writers' Workshop at Center Theater Group, she won the Fadiman Playwriting Award in 2018 for her play The Peterson Show. She was a 2016-2017 member of the Echo Theater Playwright's Lab.

As a supervising producer on HBO's Watchmen, Nabers was nominated for Writers Guild of America Awards for Best New Series and Best Drama Series and won the Best New Series award in 2020.

Works

Theatre 

 Juniper; Jubilee
 Annie Bosh is Missing
 Serial Black Face
 A Swell in the Ground
 Welcome to Jesus
 The Peterson Show

Television

Selected works 

 Nabers, Janine. "Juniper; Jubilee." Off Off Broadway Festival Plays, 33rd Series, edited by Thomas C. Dunn. New York: Samuel French, 2008 
Nabers, Janine. Letters to Kurt, Playscripts Incorporated, 2012 
 Nabers, Janine. Decade: Twenty New Plays about 9/11 and Its Legacy, edited by Samual Adamson, London: Nick Hern Books, 2012 
 Nabers, Janine. Serial Black Face. New Haven: Yale University Press, 2015 
 Nabers, Janine. "Serial Black Face." The Kilroys List: 97 Monologues and Scenes by Female and Trans Playwrights. Volume One, edited by Annah Feinberg for The Kilroys, New York: Theatre Communications Group, 2017

References

External links 
 

Year of birth missing (living people)
Living people
American television writers
American dramatists and playwrights
21st-century American writers
21st-century American women writers
African-American screenwriters
21st-century African-American women writers
21st-century African-American writers